Maria do Nascimento da Graça Amorim is a diplomat and politician from São Tomé and Príncipe. After gaining independence on 12 July 1975 she was appointed as her country's first ambassador to France and Portugal. Then in 1978 she was appointed as Foreign Minister in the government of President Manuel Pinto da Costa. This office she held until 1986 and was succeeded by Fradique de Menezes. She has been described as "fiery and militant".

References 

Ambassadors of São Tomé and Príncipe to France
Ambassadors of São Tomé and Príncipe to Portugal
Foreign Ministers of São Tomé and Príncipe
Women government ministers of São Tomé and Príncipe
Possibly living people
Female foreign ministers
20th-century women politicians
São Tomé and Príncipe women diplomats
Year of birth missing
Women ambassadors
20th-century São Tomé and Príncipe politicians